The Kieldrecht Lock (Dutch: Kieldrechtsluis), referred to as the Deurgank Dock Lock (Dutch: Deurgankdoksluis) during construction, is the largest lock in the world. The Kieldrecht Lock is the newer of two locks that give access to the left-bank docks of the Port of Antwerp in Belgium, between the Scheldt river and the Waasland Canal. The creation of the Kieldrecht lock has relieved the amount of traffic for the Waasland Canal that the Kallo Lock was experiencing. The lock, situated in the municipality of Beveren, was opened on 10 June 2016 in the presence of King Philippe of Belgium.

Construction
On 24 October 2011, work started on the Kieldrecht Lock on the left bank of the Scheldt. The construction of the lock was completed on 27 April 2015, and the lock was filled with water. The filling with 1 million m3 of water took a week. The official opening was initially planned for 15 April 2016, but opening was postponed due to heavy water damage in a technical room. The opening finally took place on 10 June 2016, in the presence of King Filip. To construct the lock, 9.1 million m3 of earth was excavated, and 22,000 tonnes of structural steel, three times the amount required to build the Eiffel Tower. Costing €340 million, of which 50% is financed by the European Investment Bank, the Flemish KBC Bank also made an €81 million credit line available, with the balance provided by the Antwerp Port Authority and the Flemish Government.

Dimensions
The dimensions of the Kieldrecht Lock are:
Length: 
Width: 
Operational depth (TAW): 
Lock gates: four sliding gates

References

External links

 Official website

Buildings and structures in Antwerp
Locks of Belgium